The Beehive is a grade II listed public house in Beehive Lane, Welwyn Garden City, in Hertfordshire. The building dates from around the early seventeenth century. It once served as a village store and later as a Beefeater steak house. The pub has been renovated to complement the beautiful historic building and opened as Coopers Grill Steak House up until its closure (2020), the restaurant also offered a premium Sunday Carvery which at the time was very popular.

References

Grade II listed pubs in Hertfordshire
Pubs in Welwyn Hatfield (district)
Welwyn Garden City